Holospira goldfussi, common name the New Braunfels holospira, is a species of air-breathing land snail, a terrestrial pulmonate gastropod mollusk in the family Urocoptidae.

The common name of this species is based on the city of New Braunfels, Texas which was founded only two years before the snail was officially named and described.

Subspecies 
 Holospira goldfussi anacachensis Bartsch

Distribution 
This species occurs in Texas, USA.

References

External links 

Urocoptidae
Gastropods described in 1847
New Braunfels, Texas